Sabeur Trabelsi (born 18 February 1978) is a Tunisian football player who plays for Chatham Town

Trabelsi previously played for Étoile Sportive du Sahel. Prior to the 2006–07 season he signed non-contract terms with  Sittingbourne in the English Isthmian League Division One South.  Trabelsi signed for Chatham Town in February 2008.

He was a member of the Tunisian 2004 Olympic football team, who exited in the first round, finishing third in group C, behind group and gold medal winners Argentina and Australia.

References

External links
 

1984 births
Living people
Tunisian footballers
Footballers at the 2004 Summer Olympics
Olympic footballers of Tunisia
Étoile Sportive du Sahel players
Sittingbourne F.C. players
Association football forwards
Olympique du Kef players